The Henry B. Tompkins House is a historic home in Atlanta, Georgia, United States. Built in 1922, it was designed by Neel Reid and is listed on the National Register of Historic Places.

The house kept its original exterior appearance with gray stucco until 2010, when the Atlanta Journal-Constitution reported it had been painted bright orange.

The house is on West Wesley Road in the Peachtree Heights West neighborhood, an area with many other historic properties.

References

Houses in Atlanta
Houses on the National Register of Historic Places in Georgia (U.S. state)
National Register of Historic Places in Atlanta
Hentz, Reid & Adler buildings
Houses completed in 1922